The Gate of Sevilla (Spanish: Puerta de Sevilla) is a gate located in Carmona, Spain. It was declared Bien de Interés Cultural in 1906.

References

See also 

 List of Bien de Interés Cultural in the Province of Seville

Bien de Interés Cultural landmarks in the Province of Seville